Pizzo, also called Pizzo Calabro, is a seaport and  in the province of Vibo Valentia (Calabria, southern Italy), situated on a steep cliff overlooking the Gulf of Saint Euphemia.

Fishing is one of the main activities, including that of tuna and coral.

History
As with many other places in Calabria, Pizzo claims ancient origins. The town may have been founded by colonists from an unknown site in ancient Magna Grecia, but there is currently no documentary or archeological evidence to support this.  Consequently, the history of Pizzo begins in 1300 when the existence of a community of Basilian monks, a fort, and a fishing village is documented . The name Pizzo (translated either as bird's beak or projecting point) fits perfectly with the tuffa promontory that juts out into the sea near the mouth of the river Angitola.

For centuries tuna was trapped in the beaches around Pizzo, especially in the months of May and June. Despite fading in importance over time this activity continued until the 1970s in the Centofontane area, where nets were spread to corral tuna from offshore. Ruins of the activity remain. The activity is now banned. The Piedigrotta and Prangi areas include some sea caves, and "the cave of the Saracen", although largely eroded today, was supposedly used by Saracen pirates to store booty and people captured during their raids along the coast of Calabria.

The former King of Naples Joachim Murat, who was the brother-in-law of Napoleon, was imprisoned for several days in the town's Aragonese castle and then sentenced to death.  He was executed by firing squad on October 13, 1815, in the main hall of the castle and was possibly buried in the church of San Giorgio. Paradoxically, the castle is now called Castello Murat. Inside the castle is the Provincial Museum Murat.

In 1783 the town was almost destroyed by an earthquake, and it suffered some damage from the same cause in 1905.

Main sights
It has an old castle, built by the Aragonese in the 15th century, in which Joachim Murat, ex-king of Naples, was shot on October 13, 1815.

Other sights include the Baroque church of St. George (1632) and the cave church  of Piedigrotta (17th century)

Food
Pizzo is famous in the area for its Tartufo, a large ball of ice cream filled with molten chocolate.

Climate

References

Notes

External links